This is the results breakdown of the Assembly of the Republic election held in Portugal on 27 September 2009. The following tables show detailed results in each of the country's 22 electoral constituencies.

Electoral system 
The Assembly of the Republic has 230 members elected to four-year terms. The number of seats to be elected by each district depends on the district magnitude. 226 seats are allocated proportionally by the number of registered voters in the 18 Districts in Mainland Portugal, plus Azores and Madeira, and 4 fixed seats are allocated for overseas voters, 2 seats for voters in Europe and another 2 seats for voters Outside Europe. The 230 members of Parliament are elected using the D'Hondt method and by a closed list proportional representation system. Members represent the country as a whole and not the constituencies in which they were elected.

Summary

Nationwide results

|- 
| colspan=11| 
|-  
! rowspan="2" colspan=2 style="background-color:#E9E9E9;text-align:left;" alignleft|Parties
! rowspan="2" style="background-color:#E9E9E9;text-align:right;" |Votes
! rowspan="2" style="background-color:#E9E9E9;text-align:right;" |%
! rowspan="2" style="background-color:#E9E9E9;text-align:right;" |±pp swing
! colspan="5" style="background-color:#E9E9E9;text-align:center;" |MPs
! rowspan="2" style="background-color:#E9E9E9;text-align:right;" |MPs %/votes %
|- style="background-color:#E9E9E9"
! style="background-color:#E9E9E9;text-align:center;" |2005
! style="background-color:#E9E9E9;text-align:center;" |2009
! style="background-color:#E9E9E9;text-align:right;" |±
! style="background-color:#E9E9E9;text-align:right;" |%
! style="background-color:#E9E9E9;text-align:right;" |±
|-
| 
|2,077,238||36.56||8.4||121||97||24||42.17||10.4||1.15
|-
| 
|1,653,665||29.11||0.3||75||81||6||35.22||2.6||1.21
|-
| 
|592,778||10.43||3.1||12||21||9||9.13||3.9||0.88
|-  
| 
|557,306||9.81||3.4||8||16||8||6.96||3.5||0.71
|-
| 
|446,279||7.86||0.3||14||15||1||6.52||0.4||0.83
|-
| 
|52,761||0.93||0.1||0||0||0||0.00||0.0||0.0
|-
| 
|25,949||0.46||||||0||||0.00||||0.0
|-
| 
|21,876||0.38||0.3||0||0||0||0.00||0.0||0.0
|-
| 
|16,924||0.30||||||0||||0.00||||0.0
|-
| 
|15,262||0.27||||0||0||0||0.00||0.0||0.0
|-
| style="width:10px;background-color:#013220;text-align:center;" | 
| style="text-align:left;" |Ecology and Humanism Front 
|12,405||0.22||||||0||||0.00||||0.0
|-
| 
|11,503||0.20||0.0||0||0||0||0.00||0.0||0.0
|-
| style="width:10px;background-color:#000080;text-align:center;" | 
| style="text-align:left;" |Portugal Pro-Life
|8,461||0.15||||||0||||0.00||||0.0
|-
|style="width: 10px" bgcolor=#CC0033 align="center" | 
|align=left|Labour
|4,974||0.09||||||0||||0.00||||0.0
|-
| 
|4,632||0.08||0.0||0||0||0||0.00||0.0||0.0
|-
| 
|3,265||0.06||||0||0||0||0.00||0.0||0.0
|-
|colspan=2 style="text-align:left;background-color:#E9E9E9"|Total valid 
|width="65" style="text-align:right;background-color:#E9E9E9"|5,505,278
|width="40" style="text-align:right;background-color:#E9E9E9"|96.91
|width="40" style="text-align:right;background-color:#E9E9E9"|0.2
|width="40" style="text-align:right;background-color:#E9E9E9"|230
|width="40" style="text-align:right;background-color:#E9E9E9"|230
|width="40" style="text-align:right;background-color:#E9E9E9"|0
|width="40" style="text-align:right;background-color:#E9E9E9"|100.00
|width="40" style="text-align:right;background-color:#E9E9E9"|0.0
|width="40" style="text-align:right;background-color:#E9E9E9"|—
|-
|colspan=2|Blank ballots
|99,086||1.74||0.1||colspan=6 rowspan=4|
|-
|colspan=2|Invalid ballots
|76,894||1.35||0.2
|-
|colspan=2 style="text-align:left;background-color:#E9E9E9"|Total 
|width="65" style="text-align:right;background-color:#E9E9E9"|5,681,258
|width="40" style="text-align:right;background-color:#E9E9E9"|100.00
|width="40" style="text-align:right;background-color:#E9E9E9"|
|-
|colspan=2|Registered voters/turnout
||9,519,921||59.68||4.6
|-
| colspan=11 style="text-align:left;" | Source: Comissão Nacional de Eleições

Constituency map

Results by constituency

Azores

Aveiro

Beja

Braga

Bragança

Castelo Branco

Coimbra

Évora

Faro

Guarda

Leiria

Lisbon

Madeira

Portalegre

Porto

Santarém

Setúbal

Viana do Castelo

Vila Real

Viseu

Europe

Outside Europe

Notes

References

External links 
 Results of 2009 legislative elections
 Official results site, Portuguese Ministry of Internal Administration
 Portuguese Electoral Commission

Legislative
2009